is a Japanese mixed martial artist, currently competing in the atomweight division of Shooto, where she is the current Shooto Super Atomweight champion.

Mixed martial arts career

DEEP JEWELS

Early career
Takano made her professional debut against Yukiko Seki at JEWELS: 20th Ring on July 21, 2012, and won the fight by unanimous decision. She amassed a 3-5 record over her next eight fights, with a notable three-fight losing streak to Mina Kurobe, Saori Ishioka and Naho Sugiyama.

Takano was scheduled to make her Road FC and Korean debut against Ga Yeon Song at Road FC 020 on December 14, 2014. She won the fight by a first-round submission.

Takano participated in the DEEP JEWELS featherweight tournament, held to crown the inaugural Jewels featherweight (-48 kg) champion. Takano first faced Masako Yoshida in the tournament quarterfinal bout at Deep Jewels 7 on February 20, 2015, and won by unanimous decision. She faced Tomo Maesawa in the tournament semifinals, held at Deep Jewels 8 on May 31, 2015. She won the fight by unanimous decision, and advanced to the finals of the one-day tournament, where she faced Mei Yamaguchi. Yamaguchi won the fight by a second-round technical knockout.

Second title run
Takano was scheduled to make her second appearance with Road FC against Jeong Eun Park at Road FC 025 on August 22, 2015. She won the fight by majority decision.

Takano was scheduled to face Emi Tomimatsu at Deep Jewels 10 on November 22, 2015. She lost the fight by split decision. Takano was next scheduled to face Tessa Simpson at PXC 52 on August 13, 2016, as a replacement for Mei Yamaguchi. She lost the fight by a third-round submission.

Takano was scheduled to face Miyuki Furusawa at Deep Jewels 14 on November 2, 2016, and won the fight by a first-round technical submission. Takano next faced Ye Jin Jung at Deep Jewels 15 on February 25, 2017, and won the fight by a 39-second guillotine choke. She was afterwards scheduled to fought a rematch with Tomo Maesawa at Deep Jewels 16 on May 20, 2017, and won by a second-round technical knockout.

Takano was next scheduled to fight a rematch with Emi Tomimatsu at Deep Jewels 17 on August 26, 2017. Tomimatsu won the fight by split decision. Takano was then scheduled to face Tomo Maesawa in a trilogy bout at Deep Jewels 18. Takano won the fight by unanimous decision, increasing her overall score against Measawa to 3-0.

Takano's third victory against Measawa earned her the right to challenge Mina Kurobe for the DEEP JEWELS Atomweight Championship at Deep Jewels 19 on March 10, 2018. Kurobe won the fight by unanimous decision.

Later career
Takano was scheduled to face Alyssa Garcia at DEEP 85 Impact on August 26, 2018. Garcia won the fight by knockout, flooring Takano with a headkick at the 2:05 minute mark of the second round.

Takano was scheduled to face Yuko Saito at Deep Jewels 22 on December 1, 2018. She won the fight by unanimous decision.

Takano made her strawweight and ONE Championship debut against Michele Ferreira at ONE Warrior Series 6 on June 20, 2019. She won the fight by a second-round submission, forcing Ferreira to tap to an armbar.

Takano made her second strawweight appearance against So Yul Kim at ONE Warrior Series 8 on October 5, 2019. She lost the fight by unanimous decision.

Shooto
Takano made her promotional debut with Shooto against Megumi Sugimoto, in a 51 kg catchweight bout, at Shooto 2020 Vol. 7 on November 23, 2020. She won the fight by a first-round submission, forcing Sugimoto to tap at the midway point of the round.

Takano returned to atomweight for her next bout, against Miku Nakamura at Shooto 2021 Vol.5 on July 25, 2021, in a title eliminator bout. She won the fight by a second-round technical knockout.

Shooto Atomweight champion
Her victory against Nakamura earned Takano the chance to challenge the reigning Shooto Super Atomweight champion Mina Kurobe at Shooto 2021 Vol.7 on November 6, 2021. He won the fight by unanimous decision, with scores of 49-46, 49-45 and 48-47. Following this victory, she was recognized as the fourth best atomweight in the world by Fight Matrix.

Takano was booked face Kanna Asakura on April 17, 2022 at Rizin 35. She lost the fight by unanimous decision.

Takano faced Laura Fontoura at Rizin Landmark 4 on November 6, 2022. She won the fight by unanimous decision.

Takano made her first Shooto Super Atomweight title defense against Ayaka Watanabe at Shooto 2023 Vol.2 on May 21, 2023.

Championships and accomplishments
Shooto
Shooto Super Atomweight Championship
Jewels
Deep Jewels Featherweight (-48 kg) Tournament Runner-up

Mixed martial arts record

|-
|Win
|align=center|17–13
|Laura Fontoura
|Decision (unanimous)
|Rizin Landmark 4
|
|align=center|3
|align=center|5:00
|Nagoya, Japan
|
|-
|Loss
|align=center|16–13
|Kanna Asakura
|Decision (unanimous)
|Rizin 35
|
|align=center|3
|align=center|5:00
|Chōfu, Japan
| 
|-
| Win
| align=center| 16–12
|Mina Kurobe
|Decision (unanimous)
|Shooto 2021 Vol.7
|
|align=center|5
|align=center|5:00
|Tokyo, Japan
|
|-
| Win
| align=center| 15–12
|Miku Nakamura
|TKO (ground and pound)
|Shooto 2021 Vol.5
|
|align=center|2
|align=center|2:48
|Tokyo, Japan
|
|-
| Win
| align=center| 14–12
|Megumi Sugimoto
|Submission (armbar)
|Shooto 2020 Vol. 7
|
|align=center|1
|align=center|2:46
|Tokyo, Japan
|
|-
| Loss
| align=center| 13–12
|So Yul Kim
|Decision (unanimous)
|ONE Warrior Series 8
|
|align=center|3
|align=center|5:00
|Tokyo, Japan
|
|-
| Win
| align=center| 13–11
|Michele Ferreira
|Submission (armbar)
|ONE Warrior Series 6
|
|align=center|2
|align=center|2:56
|Singapore, Singapore
|
|-
| Win
| align=center| 12–11
|Yuko Saito
|Decision (unanimous)
|Deep Jewels 22
|
|align=center|3
|align=center|5:00
|Tokyo, Japan
|
|-
| Loss
| align=center| 11–11
|Alyssa Garcia
|KO (head kick and punches)
|DEEP 85 Impact
|
|align=center|2
|align=center|2:05
|Tokyo, Japan
|
|-
| Loss
| align=center| 11–10
|Mina Kurobe
|Decision (unanimous)
|Deep Jewels 19
|
|align=center|5
|align=center|5:00
|Tokyo, Japan
|
|-
| Win
| align=center| 11–9
|Tomo Maesawa
|Decision (unanimous)
|Deep Jewels 18
|
|align=center|3
|align=center|5:00
|Tokyo, Japan
|
|-
| Loss
| align=center| 10–9
|Emi Tomimatsu
|Decision (split)
|Deep Jewels 17
|
|align=center|2
|align=center|5:00
|Tokyo, Japan
|
|-
| Win
| align=center| 10–8
|Tomo Maesawa
|TKO (punches)
|Deep Jewels 16
|
|align=center|2
|align=center|4:42
|Tokyo, Japan
|
|-
| Win
| align=center| 9–8
|Ye Jin Jung
|Submission (guillotine choke)
|Deep Jewels 15
|
|align=center|1
|align=center|0:39
|Tokyo, Japan
|
|-
| Win
| align=center| 8–8
|Miyuki Furusawa
|Technical submission (armbar)
|Deep Jewels 14
|
|align=center|1
|align=center|3:53
|Tokyo, Japan
|
|-
| Loss
| align=center| 7–8
|Tessa Simpson
|Submission (triangle keylock)
|PXC 52
|
|align=center|3
|align=center|2:01
|Guam, Guam
|
|-
| Loss
| align=center| 7–7
|Emi Tomimatsu
|Decision (split)
|Deep Jewels 10
|
|align=center|3
|align=center|5:00
|Tokyo, Japan
|
|-
| Win
| align=center| 7–6
|Jeong Eun Park
|Decision (majority)
|Road FC 025
|
|align=center|2
|align=center|5:00
|Wonju, South Korea
|
|-
| Loss
| align=center| 6–6
|Mei Yamaguchi
|TKO (punches)
|Deep Jewels 8
|
|align=center|2
|align=center|5:00
|Tokyo, Japan
|
|-
| Win
| align=center| 6–5
|Tomo Maesawa
|Decision (unanimous)
|Deep Jewels 8
|
|align=center|2
|align=center|5:00
|Tokyo, Japan
|
|-
| Win
| align=center| 5–5
|Masako Yoshida
|Decision (unanimous)
|Deep Jewels 7
|
|align=center|2
|align=center|5:00
|Tokyo, Japan
|
|-
| Win
| align=center| 4–5
|Ga Yeon Song
|Submission (kimura)
|Road FC 020
|
|align=center|1
|align=center|4:21
|Seoul, South Korea
|
|-
| Loss
| align=center| 3–5
|Mina Kurobe
|Submission (rear-naked choke)
|Deep Jewels 6
|
|align=center|1
|align=center|4:02
|Tokyo, Japan
|
|-
| Loss
| align=center| 3–4
|Saori Ishioka
|Submission (armbar)
|Deep Jewels 4
|
|align=center|1
|align=center|4:44
|Tokyo, Japan
|
|-
| Loss
| align=center| 3–3
|Naho Sugiyama
|Decision (split)
|Deep Jewels 3
|
|align=center|2
|align=center|5:00
|Tokyo, Japan
|
|-
| Win
| align=center| 3–2
|Miyoko Kusaka
|Submission (armbar)
|DEEP Toyama Impact Rookies 3
|
|align=center|1
|align=center|4:04
|Toyama, Japan
|
|-
| Loss
| align=center| 2–2
|Masako Yoshida
|Decision (unanimous)
|Deep Jewels 1
|
|align=center|2
|align=center|5:00
|Tokyo, Japan
|
|-
| Loss
| align=center| 2–1
|Yasuko Tamada
|Decision (unanimous)
|JEWELS: 22nd Ring
|
|align=center|2
|align=center|5:00
|Tokyo, Japan
|
|-
| Win
| align=center| 2–0
|Fukuko Hamada
|Decision (unanimous)
|JEWELS: 21st Ring
|
|align=center|2
|align=center|5:00
|Tokyo, Japan
|
|-
| Win
| align=center| 1–0
|Yukiko Seki
|Decision (unanimous)
|JEWELS: 20th Ring
|
|align=center|2
|align=center|5:00
|Tokyo, Japan
|
|-

Kickboxing record

|- style="background:#c5d2ea"
| 2013-03-25 || Draw ||align=left| Kaoru Chatani || JEWELS: 24th Ring || Tokyo, Japan || Decision (Split) || 3 || 2:00
|-
| colspan=9 | Legend:

See also
 List of Shooto champions
 List of current mixed martial arts champions

References

1990 births
Japanese female mixed martial artists
Living people
Sportspeople from Toyama Prefecture
Atomweight mixed martial artists
Strawweight mixed martial artists
Mixed martial artists utilizing kickboxing
Mixed martial artists utilizing catch wrestling
Mixed martial artists utilizing judo
Japanese female kickboxers
Japanese catch wrestlers
Japanese female judoka